Weiyuan may refer to following in China:

Weiyuan County, Gansu (渭源县), of Dingxi, Gansu
Weiyuan County, Sichuan (威远县), of Neijiang, Sichuan
Towns (威远镇)
Weiyuan, Changshun County, in Changshun County, Guizhou
Weiyuan, Huzhu County, in Huzhu Tu Autonomous County, Qinghai
Weiyuan, Youyu County, in Youyu County, Shanxi
Weiyuan, Jinggu County, in Jinggu Dai and Yi Autonomous County, Yunnan